is a Japanese record producer and DJ from Sapporo, Hokkaido. He is a former member of Denki Groove. He was also a member of Metafive.

Discography

Studio albums
 Crossover (1995)
 Take Off and Landing (1998)
 The Sound of '70s (1998)
 Lovebeat (2001)
 Liminal (2011)

Compilation albums
 Works '95–'05 (2007)

Soundtrack albums
 No Boys, No Cry (2009)

EPs
 708090 (1998)

Singles
 "Journey Beyond the Stars" (1998)
 "Lovebeat" (2002)
 "Subliminal" (2010)
 "Kamisama no Iu Tōri" (2010)

Productions
 Aco - "Yorokobi ni Saku Hana", "Kyō Made no Yūutsu", and "Taiyō" from Absolute Ego (1999)
 Aco - "4 Gatsu no Hero" from Material (2001)
 Supercar - "Yumegiwa Last Boy" from Highvision (2002)

Remixes
 Cornelius - "Moon Walk" from 96/69 (1996)
 Great 3 - "Gake ~ G-Surf (Yoshinori Sunahara Mix)" from "Glass Roots" (1996)
 Imajuku - "Horizon (Y.Sunahara Rmx)" from Cat's Cradle (1999)
 Towa Tei - "Higher (Y.Sunahara's Studio Mix)" from Lost Control Mix (1999)
 Aco - "Spleen (Y.Sunahara's Studio Remix)" from The Other Side of Absolute Ego (2000)
 Fantastic Plastic Machine - "Honolulu, Calcutta (Sunahara Yoshinori Mix)" from Les Plus (2001)
 Pizzicato Five - "Icecream Meltin' Mellow (Marin Mix 2)" from Pizzicato Five in the Mix (2001)
 Yukihiro Fukutomi - "Equality (YSST Rmx 2005)" from Equality Remixes (2005)
 Denki Groove - "Shangri-La (Y.Sunahara 2009 Remodel)" from "Upside Down" (2009)
 Rip Slyme - "Good Times (Bad Times Remix)" from Bad Times (2010)
 Yuko Ando - "Ellroy (Sunahara Yoshinori Remix)" from "Kagayakashiki Hibi" (2011)
 Sakanaction - "Lightdance (YSST Remix 2011)" from "Bach no Senritsu o Yoru ni Kiita Sei Desu" (2011)
 (((sssurrounddd))) - "Kūchū Bunkai Suru I Love You (Yoshinori Sunahara Remix)" from "Kūchū Bunkai Suru I Love You" (2013)

References

External links
 Official website
 
 

1969 births
Living people
Musicians from Sapporo
Japanese male composers
Japanese techno musicians
Japanese DJs
Electronic dance music DJs
Remixers
Ki/oon Music artists